1981 Midas, provisional designation , is a vestoid asteroid, classified as a near-Earth object and potentially hazardous asteroid, approximately 2 kilometers in diameter.

It was discovered on 6 March 1973 by American astronomer Charles Kowal at Palomar Observatory in San Diego County, California. It was named after King Midas from Greek mythology.

Classification and orbit 

The moderately bright V-type asteroid is also an Apollo asteroid, as well as a Venus and Mars-crosser. The asteroid orbits the Sun at a distance of 0.6–2.9 AU once every 2 years and 4 months (864 days). Its orbit has an eccentricity of 0.65 and an inclination of 40° with respect to the ecliptic.

However, it does not pose an impact risk for the foreseeable future. On 19 March 1947 it passed  from Earth. The last notable close approach was on 21 March 2018 passing  from Earth and shining at an apparent magnitude of +12.4. As no precoveries are known, the asteroid's observation arc begins with its discovery observation at Palomar in 1973.

With a semi-major axis of 1.78 AU, when 1 AU from the Sun (and passing Earth's orbit) the asteroid is moving at 35.7 km/s with respect to the Sun. For comparison Earth orbits the Sun at 30 km/s.

Physical characteristics 

Three rotational lightcurves obtained from photometric observations gave a concurring rotation period of 5.24 hours with a relatively high brightness variation of 0.65, 0.8 and 0.87 in magnitude, respectively.

According to the survey carried out by the Japanese Akari satellite, Midas measures 1.95 kilometers in diameter and its surface has an albedo of 0.293, while the Collaborative Asteroid Lightcurve Link assumes an albedo of 0.266 and calculates an identical diameter of 1.95 kilometers with an absolute magnitude of 15.6.

In 1987, Midas was also detected by radar from Goldstone Deep Space Communications Complex at a distance of 0.08 AU with a measured maximal radar cross-section of 0.1 km2.

Naming 

This minor planet was named after the figure from Greek mythology, Midas, the King of Phrygia, who turned whatever he touched to gold. He received this ability as an award, but soon realized that this gift was a curse when his daughter turned into a statue after he had touched her. Relieved of his power by bathing in the river Pactolus, other accounts also tell his death caused by starvation. The official  was published by the Minor Planet Center on 15 October 1977.

Notes

References

External links 
 IAUC 2816 (13 August 1975) IAUC 2890 (29 December 1975) IAUC 2979 (26 July 1976)
 NeoDys Close Approaches from 1950 to 2100
 Dictionary of Minor Planet Names, Google books
 Asteroid Lightcurve Database (LCDB), query form (info )
 Asteroids and comets rotation curves, CdR Observatoire de Genève, Raoul Behrend
 Asteroid Hazards, Part 1: What Makes an Asteroid a Hazard? Minor Planet Center on YouTube
 
 
 

001981
Discoveries by Charles T. Kowal
Named minor planets
001981
001981
001981
19730306